Gum bichromate is a 19th-century photographic printing process based on the light sensitivity of dichromates. It is capable of rendering painterly images from photographic negatives. Gum printing is traditionally a multi-layered printing process, but satisfactory results may be obtained from a single pass. Any color can be used for gum printing, so natural-color photographs are also possible by using this technique in layers.

History and process overview

Gum bichromate, or gum dichromate as it is also known, is a photographic printing process invented in the early days of photography when, in 1839, Mungo Ponton discovered that dichromates are light sensitive. William Henry Fox Talbot later found that sensitized dichromated colloids such as gelatin and gum arabic became insoluble in water after exposure to sunlight. Alphonse Poitevin added carbon pigment to the colloids in 1855, creating the first carbon print. In 1858, John Pouncy used colored pigment with gum arabic to create the first color images.

Gum prints tend to be multi-layered images sometimes combined with other alternative process  printing methods such as cyanotype and platinotype. A heavy weight cotton watercolor or printmaking paper that can withstand repeated and extended soakings is best. Each layer of pigment is individually coated, registered, exposed and washed. Separation negatives of cyan, magenta, and yellow or red, green, and blue are used for a full-color image. Some photographers prefer substituting the cyan emulsion in the CMYK separations with a cyanotype layer. A simple duotone separation combining orange watercolor pigment and a cyanotype can yield surprisingly beautiful results.

Low density photographic negatives of the same size as the final image are used for exposing the print. No enlarger is used, but instead, a contact printing frame or vacuum exposure frame is used with an ultraviolet light source such as a mercury vapor lamp, a common fluorescent black light, or the sun. The negative is sandwiched between the prepared paper and a sheet of glass in registration with previous passes.

The print is then floated face down in a bath of room-temperature water to allow the soluble gum, excess dichromate, and pigment to wash away. Several changes of water bath are necessary to clear the print. Afterwards, the print is hung to dry. When all layers are complete and dry, a clearing bath of sodium metabisulfite is used to extract any remaining dichromate so the print will be archival.

References

External links 
Movie
 Video/ Viméo
Gum Photo technical information (Wayback Machine archive)
An introduction to the gum bichromate process
Illustrated Gum Printing Tutorials and works
Gum History, Tips, Process, and Original Image Galleries 

Photographic processes dating from the 19th century
Alternative photographic processes